Laurel Hill was a railroad station on the Lower Montauk Branch of the Long Island Rail Road in Long Island City, New York. It was located on Clifton Street south of Clinton Place, neither of which exist today. Clifton Street is now 46th Street, and is a dead end street that doesn't reach the vicinity of the Montauk Branch.

Laurel Hill station was located a few blocks west of the point where the former junction between the New York and Flushing Railroad and South Side Railroad of Long Island existed. For some reason Laurel Hill didn't appear on the 1894, 1897 or 1899 timetables. It was built by the LIRR in 1890, fifteen years after that junction was eliminated for passenger service, and ten years after it was removed completely. The station was only opened for ten years and closed in 1900. Industrialization of Long Island City and the altering of both street names and street patterns (in this case by the Phelps Dodge Copper Refining and Chemical Plant) have removed all traces of the former station, which is currently along 56th Road (Laurel Hill Boulevard) halfway between 43rd and 48th Streets.

References

External links

Site of Laurel Hill station

Former Long Island Rail Road stations in New York City
Railway stations in Queens, New York
Railway stations in the United States opened in 1890
Railway stations closed in 1900
1890 establishments in New York (state)
1900 disestablishments in New York (state)
Demolished railway stations in the United States